The Challenger class is one of the submarine classes of the Republic of Singapore Navy (RSN). They are extensively modernised versions of the former  submarines. Challenger and Centurion were retired in 2015, while Conqueror and Chieftain are still in active service, as of 2022.

History
In 1995, the RSN acquired a Challenger-class vessel (formerly known as a ) from the Swedish Navy, and another three in 1997, making them Singapore's first underwater platforms. It is believed that the Challenger class were purchased to develop the required submarine operations expertise before selecting a modern class of submarines to replace them, since all the boats are over 50 years old.

Modernisation
The Challenger-class submarines have undergone the Riken modernisation programme tailored to the specific operational conditions of the Singapore Navy. As the submarines were designed by the Swedish for operations in the Baltic Sea, various modifications were required to suit them to tropical waters. A comprehensive tropicalisation programme was carried out for all four submarines, which involved installing air conditioning, marine growth protection systems and corrosion-resistant piping.

See also
 List of submarine classes in service

References

Bibliography

Conway's All the World's Fighting Ships 1947-1995

External links
Official Kockums website on the Challenger class submarines 

Submarine classes
Challenger-class submarines
Singapore–Sweden relations